Algebraic quantum field theory (AQFT) is an application to local quantum physics of C*-algebra theory. The axioms are stated in terms of an algebra given for every open set in Minkowski space, and mappings between those.

Haag–Kastler axioms 

Let  be the set of all open and bounded subsets of Minkowski space. An algebraic quantum field theory is defined via a net  of von Neumann algebras  on a common Hilbert space  satisfying the following axioms: 
 Isotony:  implies .
 Poincaré covariance: A strongly continuous unitary representation  of the Poincaré group  on  exists such that , .
 Spectrum condition: The joint spectrum  of the energy-momentum operator  (i.e. the generator of space-time translations) is contained in the closed forward lightcone.
 Existence of a vacuum vector: A cyclic and Poincaré-invariant vector  exists.

The net algebras  are called local algebras and the C* algebra  is called the quasilocal algebra.

Category-theoretic formulation 
Let Mink be the category of open subsets of Minkowski space M with inclusion maps as morphisms. We are given a covariant functor  from Mink to uC*alg, the category of unital C* algebras, such that every morphism in Mink maps to a monomorphism in uC*alg (isotony).

The Poincaré group acts continuously on Mink.

Minkowski space has a causal structure. If an open set V lies in the causal complement of an open set U, then the image of the maps

and

commute (spacelike commutativity). If  is the causal completion of an open set U, then  is an isomorphism (primitive causality).

A state with respect to a C*-algebra is a positive linear functional over it with unit norm. The states over the open sets form a presheaf structure.

According to the GNS construction, for each state, we can associate a Hilbert space representation of  Pure states correspond to irreducible representations and mixed states correspond to reducible representations. Each irreducible representation (up to equivalence) is called a superselection sector. We assume there is a pure state called the vacuum such that the Hilbert space associated with it is a unitary representation of the Poincaré group compatible with the Poincaré covariance of the net such that if we look at the Poincaré algebra, the spectrum with respect to energy-momentum (corresponding to spacetime translations) lies on and in the positive light cone. This is the vacuum sector.

QFT in curved spacetime 
More recently, the approach has been further implemented to include an algebraic version of quantum field theory in curved spacetime. Indeed, the viewpoint of local quantum physics is in particular suitable to generalize the renormalization procedure to the theory of quantum fields developed on curved backgrounds. Several rigorous results concerning QFT in presence of a black hole have been obtained.

References

Further reading

External links 
 Local Quantum Physics Crossroads 2.0 – A network of scientists working on local quantum physics
 Papers – A database of preprints on algebraic QFT
 Algebraic Quantum Field Theory – AQFT resources at the University of Hamburg

Axiomatic quantum field theory